Won Jeong-sik (born 9 December 1990) is a South Korean weightlifter, Olympian, and World Champion competing in the 69 kg category until 2018 and 73 kg starting in 2018 after the International Weightlifting Federation reorganized the categories.

Won took up weightlifting aged 14 and has a degree from the Korea National Sport University. He is married to the fellow Olympic weightlifter Yoon Jin-hee, they have two children.

Career

Olympics
He competed in the 69 kg division at the 2012 Summer Olympics placing 7th overall. In 2016 he competed at the 2016 Olympics in the 69 kg division and placed 8th overall.

World Championships
In 2017 he competed at the 2017 World Weightlifting Championships where he won the gold medal in the 69 kg division, in doing so he became the first Korean athlete to win a gold medal in this event. This was his first gold medal at the World Weightlifting Championships and his first major medal (he won a bronze medal in the clean & jerk at the 2011 World Weightlifting Championships).

In 2018 the International Weightlifting Federation reorganized the categories and Won competed in the newly created 73 kg division. He competed in the B session, and in the process of winning the silver medal he set a new world record in the clean & jerk with a lift of 195 kg. This was overtaken later in the day by Shi Zhiyong (who would later win the gold medal) with a clean & jerk of 196 kg, done in the A session.

Major results

References

External links

South Korean male weightlifters
Weightlifters at the 2012 Summer Olympics
Weightlifters at the 2016 Summer Olympics
Olympic weightlifters of South Korea
1990 births
Living people
Weightlifters at the 2010 Asian Games
Weightlifters at the 2014 Asian Games
Universiade medalists in weightlifting
World Weightlifting Championships medalists
Weightlifters at the 2018 Asian Games
Universiade silver medalists for South Korea
Asian Games competitors for South Korea
Sportspeople from Gangwon Province, South Korea
21st-century South Korean people